Alexander Robertson of Struan (c.1670 – 28 April 1749), 13th Chief of Clan Robertson, was a Scottish Jacobite soldier and poet, notable for being the only person to participate in three Jacobite risings.

Biography
Roberstson was the son of another Alexander Robertson, 11th Chief of Clan Robertson, who died in 1687 and was succeeded by his oldest son, Robert. Roberstson succeeded his elder brother as clan chief in 1688. He was a student at the University of St Andrews, but left his studies to participate in the Jacobite rising of 1689 in the army of Viscount Dundee after receiving a commission from James II. Roberston was taken prisoner by Government forces a few weeks after the Battle of Dunkeld, but was released later that year and followed James II into exile in France at Château de Saint-Germain-en-Laye. Roberston remained at the Jacobite court, spending some time in the French Royal Army, before returning to Scotland in 1703. There he became deeply involved in Jacobite plotting, training men for a new rising and in constant communication with the Jacobite court. He strongly opposed the Treaty of Union between England and Scotland in 1707.

In 1715, he led 500 of his clansmen in the Jacobite rising of that year and participated in the Battle of Sheriffmuir, but was captured for a second time in early 1716. He was rescued by Jacobite supporters and escaped to the Netherlands before returning to France. In 1725 he was created a baronet in the Jacobite peerage by James Francis Edward Stuart.

Robertson was again in Scotland by 1731 and rallied his clan to join the Jacobite rising of 1745 in support of Prince Charles. Despite his age, he travelled to meet Prince Charles at Dalnacardoch and was present with Clan Robertson at the Battle of Prestonpans in September 1745, after which he seized the carriage and possessions of General Sir John Cope as a victory prize. Being too infirm, he did not join the Jacobite advance into England. Following the defeat of the Jacobite rising in 1746, his tower house at Dunalastair was burnt down by Government soldiers and his estates were forfeited. Much of the Robertson land was returned to the clan in 1784. Robertson died in 1749; he never married and was succeeded as clan chief by a relation.

After his death, a collection of various poems that he had written throughout his life was collated into one book, which was published in 1752. His portrait is in the collection of the National Galleries of Scotland.

References

Year of birth uncertain
1749 deaths
17th-century Scottish people
18th-century Scottish people
Baronets in the Jacobite peerage
Jacobite military personnel of the Jacobite rising of 1745
People of the Jacobite rising of 1689
People of the Jacobite rising of 1715
Scottish clan chiefs
Scottish Jacobites
Scottish poets